Nicholas Herrera (born July 11, 1964) is an artist in the Northern New Mexico Santero tradition, also known as El Rito Santero ("the Saint maker of El Rito").

Life and career
He was born in El Rito, New Mexico, and his New Mexican roots helped to shape him as a artist who "follows the ever-expanding folk tradition of the Northern New Mexico santero." His art is known to provoke strong emotions, as it is satirical, religious and sometimes sad. Herrera's work takes the form of statuettes, sculptures inspired by modern issues, lithographs and plaster images. Much of his inspiration comes from a serious accident that put Herrera into a coma, during which he claims he saw a figure of death. As a result, his spiritual iconic style was born.

His work is in the permanent collections of the Smithsonian American Art Museum, Autry Museum of the American West, the Museum of International Folk Art, the Flatwater Folk Art Museum and the Sheldon Memorial Art Gallery. He is represented by EVOKE Contemporary in Santa Fe, New Mexico.

References

External links
Official website

1964 births
Living people
American folk art
Artists from New Mexico
Hispanic and Latino American artists
20th-century American artists
People from El Rito, Rio Arriba County, New Mexico